Codon royenii is a species of flowering plant in the genus Codon. It is endemic to Namibia. It is also known by the names honey bush or white nectarcup, or in Afrikaans as heuningbos and suikerkelk (meaning sugar cup).

Description 
Codon royenii  is an annual or multi-seasonal herb, reaching up to 1.3 m high.

Distribution 
Codon royenii is found in Namibia and the Northern Cape, from central Namibia to Gordonia through Namaqualand to Loeriesfontein, Biedouw Mountains, and the Tanqua Karoo.

Conservation status 
Codon royenii is classified as Least Concern.

References

External links 
 
 

Flora of Namibia
Flora of South Africa
Flora of Southern Africa
Flora of the Cape Provinces
Plants described in 1767
Taxa named by Carl Linnaeus
Boraginaceae